Guth is a surname. Notable people with the surname include:

 Alan Guth (born 1947), American cosmologist
 Alfred Guth (1908–1996), Austrian-born American water polo player, swimmer, and Olympic modern pentathlete 
 Amy Guth, American radio host and writer
 Bucky Guth (born 1966), American baseball player
 Charles Guth (1876–1948),  American businessman
 Charlie Guth (1856–1883), American baseball player
 Claus Guth (born 1964) German theatre director, focused on opera
 Dana Guth (born 1970), German politician
 Eugene Guth (1905–1990), Hungarian-American physicist
 Jean Baptiste Guth (1883–1921), French painter and illustrator
 John Guth (born 1981), American poker player
 Joseph P. Guth (1860–1928), American architect
 Larry Guth (born 1977), mathematician
 Louis D. Guth (1857–1939), American businessman and politician
 Paul Guth (1910–1997), French humorist and writer
 Raymond Guth (1924–2017), American film and television actor
 William Westley Guth (1871–1929), American attorney, Methodist minister, and academic

German-language surnames
Hungarian-language surnames